Bickington is a village and civil parish in the Teignbridge district of Devon, England, on the east edge of the Dartmoor National Park.  At the 2001 census it had a population of 311. The village is about five miles west of Newton Abbot, on the River Lemon. The church is 15th century; its lychgate has a room over it.

Amenities 
Church of St Mary the Virgin (Church of England – Grade I listed)
 Village Hall
 Public House (Dartmoor Half Way Inn)
 Camp site
 Common land (Ramshorn Down)
 Farm shop (Granny Pat's)
 Picnic area

In media 
The village appeared on the BBC's Countryfile programme in November 2017, where its apparent decline was the subject of the feature. Local media expanded on the BBC feature.

A book about Bickington, The Book of Bickington, was published in 2000.

References

External links

Villages in Devon
Civil parishes in Devon